Santa Regina is a village in Tuscany, central Italy, in the comune of Siena, province of Siena. At the time of the 2001 census its population was 60.

Santa Regina is about 10 km from Siena.

References 

Frazioni of Siena